On 6 March 2018 an Antonov An-26 transport aircraft crashed on approach to Khmeimim air base in Syria, killing all 39 people on board. All of them were servicemen of the Russian Armed Forces, including Major-General Vladimir Yeremeyev.

Aircraft
The accident aircraft was an Antonov An-26, registration RF-92955, msn 10107. It had first flown in 1980. This accident is the fifteenth An-26 fatal crash in this decade with a total of 159 deaths, none of these flights were scheduled passenger airline operations.

Crash
The preliminary cause was attributed to technical malfunction. Based on reports from the location, the Russian Ministry of Defense ruled out the possibility that it was shot down. The Investigative Committee of Russia and the Russian Military Prosecutor's Office opened criminal cases concerning the crash.

The Islamic militant group Jaysh al-Islam later claimed the responsibility for the crash; according to Ad-Diyar, five militants shot at the aircraft with heavy machine guns when it was 100 m from the ground. It was suggested that the claim might be false, as the group has made opportunistic claims in the past, as have some other groups.

Cause 
The aircraft flew on final approach with a tail wind and was caught by windshear on final. It banked, lost height and crashed some 500 metres before the runway threshold.

See also
 2012 Sudan Antonov An-26 crash
 2015 Syrian Air Force An-26 crash

References

Accidents and incidents involving the Antonov An-26
Aviation accidents and incidents in Syria
March 2018 events in Syria
Aviation accidents and incidents in 2018
Latakia Governorate in the Syrian civil war
2018 in the Syrian civil war
Russian military intervention in the Syrian civil war
Aviation history of Russia
Russian Air Force
2018 disasters in Syria